Nikole Schrepfer (born 27 November 1964) is a Swiss swimmer. She competed in the women's 400 metre freestyle and women's 800 metre freestyle events at the 1980 Summer Olympics.

References

External links
 

1964 births
Living people
Swiss female freestyle swimmers
Olympic swimmers of Switzerland
Swimmers at the 1980 Summer Olympics
Place of birth missing (living people)
20th-century Swiss women